Lepidilema is a genus of moths in the subfamily Arctiinae. It contains the single species Lepidilema unipectinata, which is found in Kenya, Malawi and Tanzania.

References

Natural History Museum Lepidoptera generic names catalog

Lithosiini